Zeinat Olwi whose stage name was Zurah, (1930–1988) was one of the leading belly dancers in Egypt in the middle of the twentieth century. She appeared in many movies from the Egyptian Golden Age of cinema. One of her most famous performances was in Henry Barakat's 1955 movie Ayyam wa layali (Days and Nights).

Anglicizations of her name
Her given name is anglicized variously as Zeinat, Zinat, Zinaat, and Zenat. Her surname is variously given as Olwi, Elwi, Aloui.

Filmography
 Ayyam wa layali (Days and Nights) (1955)
 El-Zawga Talattashar (Wife Number 13)
Karamat Zawgaty (My Wife's Dignity) (1967)
Sabah El Kheir ya Zawgaty El-Aziza (Good Morning, My Dear Wife) (1969)

External links
video clips for Zeinat Olwi in Egyptian movies

1930 births
1988 deaths
Egyptian film actresses
Egyptian female dancers
Belly dancers
20th-century Egyptian actresses